Anderson Creek is a census-designated place located in the Anderson Creek Township of Harnett County, North Carolina, United States. It was first listed as a CDP in the 2020 census with a population of 13,636.

Notable landmarks near the community include Anderson Creek Plaza and the Anderson Creek Golf Club. It is a part of the Dunn Micropolitan Area, which is also a part of the greater Raleigh–Durham–Cary Combined Statistical Area (CSA) as defined by the United States Census Bureau.

Current talks are in place on incorporating Anderson Creek as a town, which would entail a post office being opened in the community. Currently, most Anderson Creek residents have Spring Lake addresses with the zip code 28390. Anderson Creek is served by the Harnett County Sheriff's department for law enforcement and Anderson Creek Emergency Services for fire and emergency services.

Anderson Creek is a fast-growing community. Increased rapid growth of the community can be attributed to the increase of the military at the nearby Ft. Bragg, as well as the Davis Love III-created golf course, Anderson Creek Club. Just recently, at the intersection of Ray and Overhill's roads, a shopping center was added. The Anderson Creek Shopping Center comprises a Food Lion, China Star Chinese takeout, Domino's Pizza, Family Dollar and a Citi Nails nail salon. The movie gallery location is now a Fit 4 Life Health Club. The Tigers Pizza and Subs restaurant have moved to a new location near Highway 210 and Manchester Road in neighboring Cumberland County.

The Anderson Creek Plaza includes a McDonald's restaurant, Subway restaurant, a Tobacco Station, a dry-cleaners (Monarch Cleaners) and the Anderson Creek Pharmacy.

North Carolina's Department of Transportation is currently planning road expansion along Ray Road, and as a result the Short Stop Convenience Store & Gas station has closed, and the State Farm Insurance Company office as well as a barber shop have moved to the Anderson Creek Plaza from a nearby location on Ray Road.

Demographics

2020 census

Note: the US Census treats Hispanic/Latino as an ethnic category. This table excludes Latinos from the racial categories and assigns them to a separate category. Hispanics/Latinos can be of any race.

Anderson Creek Club 
Anderson Creek Club is a residential golf course community in the United States, located in the unincorporated community of Anderson Creek, North of Fayetteville, North Carolina.

Anderson Creek Club is a luxury gated community featuring a course and a charter school. The golf course was designed by Davis Love III. When it opened in 2001, it was acclaimed as the "best new course in North Carolina", and was awarded 4 1/2 Stars by Golf Digest.

Schools
 South Harnett Elementary
 Anderson Creek Primary
 Overhills High
 Overhills Middle
 Overhills Elementary

References

Census-designated places in Harnett County, North Carolina
Census-designated places in North Carolina
Unincorporated communities in Harnett County, North Carolina
Unincorporated communities in North Carolina